Thatrom Thookrom is a 2020 Indian Tamil-language action drama film written and directed by Arul S. The film stars Teejay Arunasalam, Cheenu Mohan and Kaali Venkat while Sampath Ram portrays a negative role. Balamurali Balu composed music for the film while Kabilan Vairamuthu penned lyrics for the songs. The film had a low profile theatrical release on 14 November 2020.

Cast 

 Teejay Arunasalam as Kaaka
 Fouziee as Anjana
 Nandu Suresh as Kadugu
 Sakthivel Kalkona as Urulai
 Cheenu Mohan as Rajamanickam
 Kaali Venkat as Pandian
 Linga as Inspector Sekar
 Sakthi Saravanan as ACP Rajaram
 G. Marimuthu as Dhandapani
 Crane Manohar as Murugan
 Sampath Ram as Chinna
 G. V. Subba Rao
 Sivavelavan
 Ravi Venkatraman as Manikandan
 Supergood Subramani as Madhusudhanan
 Udumalai Ravi

Production and marketing 
The principal photography of the film began during early 2018 with Teejay Arunasalam being signed to play the lead role in 2017. Most of the portions of the film were shot and set in Chennai. The film was initially speculated to be based on the 2016 Indian banknote demonetisation, however, the director revealed that the film will not be analysing the concept.

Music 
The music rights for the film are owned by Balamurali Balu. The first single "Demonetisation anthem" was released during November 2017 and became viral despite controversies. The song was inspired from the demonetisation which was imposed by Indian Prime minister Narendra Modi on 8 November 2016.

Accolades
 This film was officially selected at Toronto International Tamil Film Festival

Controversy 
A theme song about demonetisation called "Demonetisation anthem" which was sung by actor Silambarasan was released during the occasion of the first anniversary of the note ban in India in November 2017. However the song raised controversies among political fraternity particularly for its content on criticising the demonetisation. Actor Simbu was under scanner for singing the song and was provided special police protection.

Reception 
A critic from Maalai Malar called the film interesting.

References

External links 
 

2020 films
2020s Tamil-language films
Indian action drama films
Films shot in Chennai
2020 action drama films
Films scored by Balamurali Balu